Monte Galero is a mountain in Liguria, northern Italy, part of the Alps.  It is located in the provinces of Savona and Cuneo. It lies at an altitude of 1708 metres and, after Monte Armetta, is the second highest summit of the Ligurian Prealps.

SOIUSA classification 
According to the SOIUSA (International Standardized Mountain Subdivision of the Alps) the mountain can be classified in the following way:
 main part = Western Alps
 major sector =  South Western Alps
 section = Ligurian Alps
 subsection = Prealpi Liguri
 supergroup = Catena Settepani-Carmo-Armetta
 group = Gruppo Galero-Armetta
 subgroup = Costiera Galero-Armetta
 code = I/A-1.I-A.3.a

Hiking 
The mountain is accessible by off-road mountain paths and is crossed by the Alta Via dei Monti Liguri, a long-distance trail from Ventimiglia (province of Imperia) to Bolano (province of La Spezia).

Nature conservation 
The mountain and its surrounding area are part of a SIC (Site of Community Importance) called Monte Galero  (code: IT1323920).

References

External links

Mountains of the Ligurian Alps
Mountains of Liguria
Mountains of Piedmont
One-thousanders of Italy
Natura 2000 in Italy